The Ullal City Municipal is the municipal corporation responsible for looking after the city administration of the city of Ullal in Mangalore, Karnataka, India.

The Ullal located was formed as Nagara Panchayat in 1996. This was upgraded to Town Municipal Council in 2006. In 2014, this was again upgraded to City Municipal Council.

Ullal is a region/neighborhood in the southern part of Mangalore city with a population more than 53,000 as per the 2011 census. The incumbent president of the corporation is Chithrakala Chandrakanth and the vice president Ayub Manchila. Ullal was upgraded from Town Municipal to City Municipal in the year 2014. Ullal City Municipal along with Mangalore City Corporation forms a continuous urban area and comes under Mangalore Urban Agglomeration.

Ullal City Municipal belongs to Mangalore(erstwhile Ullal) — Vidhan Sabha constituency of Karnataka Legislative assembly and Dakshina Kannada (Lok Sabha constituency) of the Lok Sabha (lower house of the Indian parliament).

See also 
 Ullal
 Thokottu
 Mangalore City Corporation

References 

Dakshina Kannada district
Municipal councils in Karnataka